Ali Sufiyan Afaqi (22 August 1933  27 January 2015; sometimes spelled Sufyan Afaqi), was a Pakistani film producer, writer and journalist. He made his debut in Lollywood films with his first ever Urdu film Thandi Sarak in 1957, and later appeared in other films as a writer and director, however he earned recognition as a film producer. He wrote about twenty eight uncertain books on travel documentary and biographies, including Filmi Alif Laila, a book containing history of Pakistani cinema.

He was born on 22 August 1933 as Ali Sufiyan in British India (in modern-day Sehore district of Bhopal, India). Following the split of Indian subcontinent, he along with his family migrated to Pakistan and stayed in Lahore. At the time of migration, he was fourteen. In 1951, he obtained Bachelor of Arts with Hons.

Early life 
After he obtained his BA, he worked for an insurance company during his initial career span, and later joined newspapers where he used to wrote columns and other subjects such as social, politics and culture. He first joined Daily Tasneem and Jamaat-e-Islami. He also worked at Chattan, a weekly newspaper established by Agha Shorish Kashmiri, and later worked at Nawaiwaqt Group. In later years, he joined Daily Afaq newspaper where he choose his last name "Afaq" and became known as Ali Sufiyan Afaq. He wrote first-ever film review in Afaq newspaper and then choose it as regular job. As an editor, he worked at Aqwam weekly and as joint editor at Daily Aasar. Following the 1958 Pakistani coup d'état, he left journalism and moved to film industry.

Career 
He first joined the Urdu cinema as a storywriter and later wrote dialogues for Aadmi and Ayyaz films. In 1965, he worked as a producer of Kaneez film. Prior to his association as a producer, he first worked in Thandi Sarak film as a storywriter. As a storywriter, producer and director, he produced Urdu language films such as Joker, Aaj Kal, Aasra Aik Hi Rasta and Shikwa among others. During a film festival held in Russia by the Tashkent International Film Festival selected his films such as  Aas, Saiqa and Ajnabi and translated them into Russian language.

Filmography

Awards
He was the recipient of eight Nigar Awards, six Graduate Awards and one Musawar Award and one Kartak Award.

Death 
He was suffering from health complications over the past few years and died in Lahore, Pakistan on 27 January 2015 of cancer.

Bibliography

References 

1933 births
2015 deaths
Pakistani film producers
Film directors from Lahore
Urdu-language writers from Pakistan
20th-century Pakistani writers
Pakistani male journalists
Muhajir people
Nigar Award winners